The 2014–15 Campeonato Nacional season was the 84th season of top-flight football in Chile. Colo-Colo was the defending champion.

Format changes
Same as last season: Apertura and Clausura format, without playoffs.

Teams

Stadia and locations

Personnel and kits

Torneo Apertura

Standings

Results

Apertura Liguilla
Winner qualify for 2015 Copa Libertadores first stage (Chile 3).
Runner-up qualify for 2015 Copa Sudamericana first stage (Chile 4).

Torneo Clausura

Standings

Results

Clausura Liguilla
Winner qualify for 2015 Copa Sudamericana first stage (Chile 3).

Aggregate table

Relegation

References

External links
ANFP 
Season regulations 
Chilean Primera División 2014/2015 Apertura at Soccerway
Chilean Primera División 2014/2015 Clausura at Soccerway
Chilean Primera División 2014/2015 Liguilla at Soccerway

 
1
Primera División de Chile seasons
Chile
Chile